India participated in the 1986 Asian Games held in Seoul, South Korea from September 20 to October 5, 1985. Ranked 5th with 5 gold medals, 9 silver medals and 23 bronze medals with a total of 37 over-all medals. 4 of the 5 gold medals were won by P.T.Usha.

Medals by sport

References

Nations at the 1986 Asian Games
1986
Asian Games